Peter Riegert (born April 11, 1947) is an American actor. He is best known for his roles as Donald "Boon" Schoenstein in Animal House (1978), oil company executive "Mac" MacIntyre in Local Hero (1983), pickle store owner Sam Posner in Crossing Delancey (1988), Lt. Mitch Kellaway in The Mask (1994), and glove manufacturer Lou Levov in American Pastoral (2016). He directed the short film By Courier (2000), for which he was nominated along with producer Ericka Frederick for the Academy Award for Best Live Action Short Film.

On television, Riegert had a recurring role as crooked Newark Assemblyman and later State Senator Ronald Zellman in seasons three and four of the HBO series The Sopranos (2001–2002), appeared as George Moore in the first season of the FX series Damages (2007), and portrayed Seth Green's father in the comedy series Dads (2013–2014). He was nominated for a Primetime Emmy Award for his performance in the HBO film Barbarians at the Gate in 1993.

Early life and education

Riegert was born on April 11, 1947, in the Bronx, New York, the son of Lucille, a piano teacher, and Milton Riegert, a food wholesaler. Riegert grew up in Hartsdale, New York, and was raised in a non-observant Jewish household.

He graduated from Ardsley High School in 1964 and later from the University at Buffalo. He worked at a number of jobs, including teaching, waiting tables, and as a social worker before settling on acting as a career.

Career

Stage

Riegert made his Broadway debut in the musical Dance with Me. Other Broadway credits include The Old Neighborhood, An American Daughter, The Nerd, and Censored Scenes From King Kong. Off-Broadway he has appeared in Road to Nirvana, The Birthday Party, Isn't It Romantic, Sexual Perversity in Chicago, and A Rosen by Any Other Name.

Film
Riegert's film debut came in 1978's National Lampoon's Animal House. He has subsequently appeared in films such as Crossing Delancey, Local Hero, The Mask, Traffic, and We Bought a Zoo. Also played in "The Baby dance" a 1998 film.

Television

Riegert made his television debut in two episodes of M*A*S*H. He has also portrayed Newark Assemblyman and later New Jersey State Senator Ronald Zellman in The Sopranos and defense attorney Chauncey Zeirko in multiple episodes of Law & Order: Special Victims Unit. He starred opposite former girlfriend Bette Midler in the television adaptation of Gypsy and was featured in the HBO drama Barbarians at the Gate (which earned him an Emmy Award nomination for Outstanding Supporting Actor in a Miniseries or a Special). He also starred as composer Jake Rubin (based on real-life composer Irving Berlin) in the 1984 miniseries Ellis Island, the final episode of Seinfeld as the president of NBC, and the television movie Back When We Were Grownups. Riegert voiced the character of Max Weinstein in the controversial episode "When You Wish Upon a Weinstein" of Family Guy. Riegert guest-starred in a Season 2 episode of Leverage as corrupt lawyer Peter Blanchard. In 2011, Riegert began a multi-episode arc on One Tree Hill as August Kellerman, Nathan's unforgiving college professor. Riegert appeared as the character George Moore in Season 1 of Damages. He also appeared in a recurring role as Judge Harvey Winter in CBS' The Good Wife. He appeared in Dads as David Sachs, the father of Eli Sachs, played by Seth Green. Riegert also appeared in Seasons 3 and 4 of Unbreakable Kimmy Schmidt. He made a multi-episode guest appearance in the second half of the Netflix original comedy series Disjointed. Riegert has a recurring role as left-wing lawyer Roger Pugh on Season 3 of the HBO series Succession.

Director and writer

Riegert made his screenwriting and directorial debuts with By Courier, based on a short story by O. Henry. It received an Academy Award nomination for Best Live Action Short Film and won him the Festival Award for Best First Feature at the Marco Island Film Festival.

Riegert also directed and co-wrote King of the Corner, a 2004 film featured at the Newport Film Festival, in which he also starred alongside Isabella Rossellini. It also featured Eric Bogosian, Dominic Chianese, Beverly D'Angelo and Rita Moreno.

Voice work

Riegert narrated the audiobook of Michael Chabon's The Yiddish Policemen's Union, which was nominated for a 2008 Audie Award in literary fiction. He also narrated the audiobook of The Voyage of the Narwhal, and has read the stories of Raymond Carver.

He was also the narrator for The First Basket, a documentary film on professional basketball's influence on Jewish culture.

Filmography

Film

Television

References

External links

IndustryCentral profile
AllMovie.com profile
Interview with Riegert

1947 births
Living people
20th-century American male actors
21st-century American male actors
American male film actors
American male stage actors
American male television actors
Film directors from New York City
Male actors from New York City
Jewish American male actors
Jewish American writers
Outstanding Performance by a Cast in a Motion Picture Screen Actors Guild Award winners
People from Hartsdale, New York
People from the Bronx
University at Buffalo alumni
21st-century American Jews